Juan Armando Hinojosa Cantú (born 3 January 1956) is a Mexican construction contractor and business tycoon.

He is closely connected to President Enrique Peña Nieto, who serves as his son's godfather. He was named in the Panama Papers in 2016 and the Pandora Papers in 2021.

A native of Reynosa, he moved to the State of Mexico in the 1980s and founded Grupo Higa.

References

Living people
1956 births
Mexican businesspeople
People from Reynosa
People named in the Panama Papers
People named in the Pandora Papers